Acacia georginae is a perennial tree which is native to arid areas of central Australia and has been introduced into the United States. Common names for it include Georgina gidgee, Georgina gidyea and poison gidyea.

Description
Like most species of Acacia it has phyllodes rather than true leaves. It blooms between May and August and produces seed pods between September and December.

Taxonomy
The species was first formally described by the botanist Frederick Manson Bailey in 1896 as a part of the work Botany. Contributions to the Flora of Queensland as published in the Botany Bulletin. Department of Agriculture, Queensland. It was reclassified as Racosperma georginae by Leslie Pedley in 1987 then transferred back to genus Acacia in 2001. The specific epithet recognizes the place that the type specimen was collected, along the Georgina River.

Distribution
Georgina gidgee woodlands have a patchy but widespread distribution in central Australia and are considered Vulnerable (VU) according to the IUCN Red List of Ecosystems. It is widely distributed through arid parts of central and eastern Australia from the southeastern Northern Territory in the west extending into Queensland to around the catchment of the Georgina River in the northeast and into the far northeast of South Australia in the southeast, where it is usually situated along water-courses or on plains growing in loamy or clay soils as a part of low open woodland communities.

Uses 
Its uses include timber and fuel.
Primarily the seed pods can be extremely poisonous, since they may contain what are called organic fluoroacetates. Unfortunately, sheep and cattle sometimes are poisoned after grazing on the pods.

References

External links 

georginae
Fabales of Australia
Trees of Australia
Flora of Queensland
Flora of the Northern Territory
Flora of South Australia
Plants described in 1896
Taxa named by Frederick Manson Bailey